The net migration rate  is the difference between the number of immigrants (people coming into an area) and the number of emigrants (people leaving an area) divided by the population. When the number of immigrants is larger than the number of emigrants, a positive net migration rate occurs. A positive net migration rate indicates that there are more people entering than leaving an area. When more emigrate from a country, the result is a negative net migration rate, meaning that more people are leaving than entering the area. When there is an equal number of immigrants and emigrants, the net migration rate is balanced.

The net migration rate is calculated over a one-year period using the mid year population and a ratio.

Migration occurs over a series of different push and pull factors that revolve around social, political, economical, and environmental factors according to Migration Trends. Social migration is when an individual migrates to have a higher standard of living, to be closer to family, or to live in a nation with which they identify more. Political migration then is when a person is going in as a refugee to escape war or political persecution. This form of migration can also be called forced migration. This happens when refugees are moving to neighboring countries or more developed countries. Neighboring countries, especially the ones in the middle east are dependent on to shelter the refugees. Just like the United States, many of the more wealthy countries are now the hosts to many of these refugees. Economical migration is moving to a place where one can aspire to have a career and better job opportunities which end up contributing to better living conditions. Lastly, environmental migration is when natural disasters force you to move into a new area. By analyzing all of the migrating factors you can get to the idea that the net migration rate can say a lot about a country. For example, if there are a lot of people coming in and not many leaving it can be assumed to be a wealthy country that keeps evolving and generating more and more opportunities. On the other hand, if few people are coming in and many are leaving it can be assumed that there is a possibility of violence, low economy, or not enough resources to fulfill the existing population.

Formula and example
N = (I - E) / M X 1,000

N = Net Migration Rate

I = Number of Immigrants Entering the Area

E = Number of Emigrants Leaving the Area

M = Mid Year Population

At the start of the year, country A had a population of 1,000,000. Throughout the year there was a total of 200,000 people that immigrated to (entered) country A, and 100,000 people that emigrated from (left) country A. Throughout the year there was a total of 100,000 births and 100,000 deaths. What is the net migration rate?

First, find the mid-year population for country A.

M = [ Population at Start of Year + Population at End of Year ] / 2

M = [  1,000,000 + (1,000,000 + 200,000 - 100,000) ] / 2

M = [ 1,000,000 + 1,100,000 ] / 2

M = 2,100,000 / 2

M = 1,050,000

The mid-year population for country A is 1,050,000.

Second, find the net migration for country A, and please keep in mind this is simply the number of immigrants minus the number of emigrants, not the actual rate.

I - E = 200,000 - 100,000

I - E = 100,000

The net migration for country A is 100,000.

Third, plug your findings into the formula to find the net migration rate for country A.

N = (I - E) / M X 1,000

N = 100,000 / 1,050,000 X 1,000

N = 95.23809523809524

N = 95.2

The net migration rate for country A is 95.2 per 1,000 people. This means that for every 1,000 people in country A at the beginning of the year, 95.2 will have immigrated to country A by the end of the year. This number numerically shows the impact of migration on the country's population and allows for the comparison of country A's net migration rate to other country's net migration rate.

Issues 

Net migration has a major key role in every single country. Like mentioned before if a country has a high migration rate is it seen as wealthy and developed. In contrast, a country with a low rate is seen as undeveloped, having political problems, and lacking resources its citizens need. Every country needs a stable number of people going in and out of its territory in order to have a stable economy. If the number of people coming in is greater than the number of people leaving, there will be a greater demand for resources and a tighter yet growing economy. On the other hand, a country with a lower migration rate will most likely lose many of its available resources due to a lack of consumerism and production. Conflicts can arise due to migration, but people can still find it easier than ever to move to a different place. This can be due to more advanced technology and being able to communicate and have more efficient forms of transportation. All of this creates more opportunities which then increases the amount of net migration. The United States is an example of a country with growing opportunities as migration increases. Other occurring problems caused by net migration is a rise in the dependency ratio, higher demand on government resources, and public congestion. A high dependency ratio can be a factor caused by net migration. The dependency ratio can increase as the elder population increases and the fertility rate decreases. This results in a decrease in the labor force and this can hurt a country's economy by causing it to slow down. In order to slow down this process countries have many things, such as increasing the retirement age in order to keep the elderly involved in the workforce as much as possible.

See also
Demography
Human migration
List of countries by net migration rate
Population dynamics

References

External links
World Net migration rate Map
Planet Wire - Glossary of Terms
Census Bureau - Glossary

Demographics indicators
Migration rate, net
Human migration
Rates